Billy Chiles (born January 14, 1985 in Washington, DC) is an American retired soccer player who is currently an assistant coach for the South Florida Bulls.

Career

Youth and College
Chiles grew up in Silver Spring, Maryland, and played college soccer at Towson University, where he was a NSCAA 2nd Team All American, was named to the 1st Team All-CAA, and the CAA All Tournament Team in 2007-2008

Professional
Chiles was drafted by Columbus Crew in the first round (6th overall) of the 2008 MLS Supplemental Draft, and spent the 2008 pre-season training the team, but ultimately was not offered a professional contract.

He signed with Crystal Palace Baltimore in the USL Second Division in 2009, and made his professional debut on May 15, 2009 in a game against Western Mass Pioneers.

Coaching
During his professional playing career, Chiles also served as assistant coach and director of operations for his alma mater, the Towson Tigers. In 2015, Chiles joined the coaching staff of the George Mason Patriots. Chiles joined the South Florida Bulls staff on May 13, 2022.

Career statistics
(correct as of September 29, 2009)

References

External links
 Crystal Palace Baltimore player profile

Living people
American soccer players
1985 births
Crystal Palace Baltimore players
Towson Tigers men's soccer players
USL Second Division players
Columbus Crew draft picks
Soccer players from Washington, D.C.
Association football goalkeepers
Canisius College alumni
Towson Tigers men's soccer coaches
George Mason Patriots men's soccer coaches
South Florida Bulls men's soccer coaches
Soccer players from Maryland
People from Silver Spring, Maryland
Sportspeople from Montgomery County, Maryland
Association football goalkeeping coaches
High school soccer coaches in the United States